Kamta Prasad was an Indian politician from the state of the Madhya Pradesh.
He represented Jatara Vidhan Sabha constituency of Madhya Pradesh Legislative Assembly by winning General election of 1957.

References 

People from Madhya Pradesh
Madhya Pradesh MLAs 1957–1962
People from Tikamgarh district
Date of birth missing
Date of death missing
Indian National Congress politicians from Madhya Pradesh